Cornelius Dennis "Mad Dog" Madigan (born October 4, 1934) is a Canadian retired professional ice hockey defenceman notable for being the oldest rookie in National Hockey League (NHL) history.

Dennis was born in Port Arthur, Ontario. After playing several years in senior leagues in Ontario and British Columbia in the late 1950s, Madigan had a lengthy career as a minor league star, most notably with the Fort Wayne Komets of the International Hockey League for three seasons in the early 1960s, and then for the Portland Buckaroos of the Western Hockey League for nine seasons.  He won accolades as First Team league All-Star in 1960, 1966, 1967, 1968 and 1969, Second Team All-Star in 1965, 1971 and 1972, as well as winning best defenceman honors in 1966.

Beset with numerous injuries in the 1972–73 NHL season, the St. Louis Blues of the NHL bought Madigan's rights from the Buckaroos, and he suited up for the Blues in January 1973 at the age of 38, becoming the oldest rookie ever.  He played competently for the Blues in twenty regular-season games and five playoff games, before finishing his career with Portland in parts of the two successive seasons.

At the time of his retirement, Madigan was second in minor league history in career penalty minutes. Despite being retired for 40 seasons, Madigan is still 89th in career penalty minutes.

In addition to Madigan's hockey career, he had a minor role in the 1977 cult classic movie Slap Shot as legendary hockey goon Ross "Mad Dog" Madison.

References

External links
 

1934 births
Living people
Canadian ice hockey defencemen
Cleveland Barons (1937–1973) players
Dallas Black Hawks players
Fort Wayne Komets players
Ice hockey people from Ontario
Los Angeles Blades (WHL) players
Portland Buckaroos players
Providence Reds players
San Diego Gulls (WHL) players
Spokane Comets players
Spokane Spokes players
Sportspeople from Thunder Bay
St. Louis Blues players